Metidae is a family of copepods belonging to the order Harpacticoida.

Genera:
 Ilyopsilla
 Lauberia
 Laubieria Soyer, 1966
 Metis Philippi, 1843

References

Copepods